Gilady is a surname. Notable people with the surname include:

Eival Gilady (born 1957), Israeli businessman and philanthropist
Nitzan Gilady, Israeli film director

Hebrew-language surnames